Bilder (released September 18, 1995 by the label Curling Legs - CLPCD 18) is a studio album by Vigleik Storaas Trio.

The material on this first album by the Vigleik Storaas Trio is composed by Storaas, and accompanied by Johannes Eick (double bass) and Per Oddvar Johansen (drums).  The album won the 1995 Spelleman Award for Jazz.

Track listing 
«Slapp Av» (5:44)
«Ernest» (6:36)
«Monk's Picture» (6:23)
«Sco's Tune» (6:23)
«Ballade Impromptu» (6:24)
«Noe Annet» (6:06)
«Monk's Pencils» (4:20)
«Månelyst» (5:33)
«Tankalerl» (5:14)
«En Fremmed» (5:50)
«'Round Midnight» (4:28)

Personnel 
Piano – Vigleik Storaas
Double bass – Johannes Eick
Drums – Per Oddvar Johansen

Credits 
Produced by the trio and Jan Erik Kongshaug
Recorded at Rainbow Studios, Oslo, October 24–25, 1994
Mixed October 26, 1994
Engineered and mixed by Jan Erik Kongshaug
Edited and mastered by Jan Erik Kongshaug
Fraphic Design by March How
Liner Photos by Johs Bøe

References 

Spellemannprisen winners
Vigleik Storaas albums
1995 albums